Arbiblatta is a genus of cockroaches within the family Ectobiidae. There are currently 9 species assigned to the genus.

Species 

 Arbiblatta abdelazizi 
 Arbiblatta azruensis 
 Arbiblatta chavesi 
 Arbiblatta haffidi 
 Arbiblatta infumata 
 Arbiblatta larrinuae 
 Arbiblatta reticulata 
 Arbiblatta sancta 
 Arbiblatta syriaca

References 

Cockroach genera